MRX may refer to:

The ABCG2 gene
MRX complex, DNA damage repair complex in yeast
The Magnetic Reconnection eXperiment led by DoE's Princeton Plasma Physics Laboratory
Mahshahr Airport, Iran, by IATA airport code
Philips HeartStart MRx cardiac monitor/defibrillator
Proposed pressurized water reactor for ship propulsion developed by the Japan Atomic Energy Research Institute (JAERI)

ម៉ែ រុំ